The men's nanquan competition at the 1998 Asian Games in Bangkok, Thailand, was held on 17 December at the Thammasat Gymnasium 6.

Schedule

Results 
Only the top six placing scores are preserved.

References 

Wushu at the 1998 Asian Games